Luis Adrián Álvaro Lastra (born 26 February 1984), known professionally as Adrián Lastra, is a Spanish actor, dancer and singer, known for his performance as Pedro in the TV series Velvet and Velvet Colección.

Biography 
Luis Adrián Álvaro Lastra was born on 26 February 1984 in Palomeras Bajas, Puente de Vallecas, Madrid, to a working-class family. Before entering his scenic career, Lastra took vocational training courses in electronics, but according to him, he was a "bad student". Reportedly moved to start a musical career after watching David Bustamante's performances in Operación Triunfo, his education in this area began in 2003, taking classes of vocal technique and musical performance as student of Victoria Manso and Patricia Ferro.

He began a career in musical theatre in 2004. He has since starred in stage plays such as Broadway Millennnium, Hoy no me puedo levantar, En tu fiesta me colé, Flashdance, Billy Elliot, El discurso del rey. His first main role in television was his performance as 'Pipo' in the Corta-T series, aired on Cuatro.

He starred in the film 2011 film Primos (Cousinhood), playing José Miguel, a military veteran of Afghanistan, addicted to pills. This performance earned him a nomination to the Goya Award for Best New Actor in 2012.

He also performed as leading actor in the 2011 comedy Fuga de cerebros 2 (sequel to Fuga de cerebros), playing Alfonso Carbajosa. He also played a teacher in seduction techniques in the 2017 comedy El club de los buenos infieles. Venturing into horror, Lastra starred in as leading actor in Noctem, a 2017 mockumentary film directed by Marcos Cabotá in which Lastra played himself. Lastra also appeared in the 2020 comedy Hasta que la boda nos separe.

Lastra became very popular for his role as the Pedro Infantes in the series Velvet, reprised in the sequel Velvet Colección.

Filmography 

Film

Television

Awards and nominations

References

External links
 

Spanish male musical theatre actors
Spanish male television actors
Spanish male stage actors
Spanish male film actors
21st-century Spanish male actors
1984 births
Living people
People from Madrid